Adventure Island is a theme park in Southend-on-Sea, Essex, England. The site of the theme park flanks the north end of Southend Pier and has been a theme park since 1976 when the land now forming the west side of the park was purchased by the Miller family. The park used to be known as Peter Pan’s Playground and later Peter Pan’s Adventure Island before becoming Adventure Island. The site is owned and managed by Stockvale Limited. The park contains thirty six rides, retail outlets, and numerous catering outlets.

History

Adventure Island started out in 1918 as Sunken Gardens, a sea-side garden that in the 1920s installed a few children's rides. In 1976, the land to the west of the pier was purchased by the Miller family. They developed the amusement park on the site from the rudimentary original and the entire site was redeveloped extensively.

In 1995 the park was vastly expanded when the land to the east of the pier was purchased to form part of the park.

Complementing the park is Southend Pier, the longest pleasure pier in the world (built in 1830 as a wooden pier, rebuilt as a steel pier in 1889); it extends more than a mile (1,34 miles/2,16 km) toward the ocean. The pier train runs the entire length of the pier to the Lifeboat Museum. The park runs both east and west sides of the pier. The park's mascots are called Snappy, Rage Man, Jakey and Jan.

Adventure Island is not divided into specific areas but divides its rides into height restrictions: no height limit, must be over 1 metre, must be over 1.2 metres, must be over 1.3 metres. Before 2021, they used to have colour coded wristbands depending on height. Red bands would be for under 1m tall, green for under 1.2m tall, and blue for over 1.2 metres tall. The park is separated into the East side of the pier, and the West side of the pier. It also has an inside area in the middle called Adventure Inside with a 5 storey softplay centre, 4 rides Funtopia arcade and a café.  

In 1999, the park debuted the roller coaster Green Scream. It was once described as the park's signature ride, but this title has now been taken by Rage. The Green Scream does not have any inversions and the drops are quite tame. The second roller coaster at the park is the Barnstormer, which opened in 2000. The third roller coaster is named the Mighty Mini Mega, which opened in 2002. Kiddi Koasta, a children's roller coaster, opened to the public on 30 April 2011.

The fifth roller coaster, Rage, opened in February 2007. It is one of the biggest investments the park has ever made. The ride cost in the region of £3 million and is located on the former Raging River Log Flume site. The Sky Drop and Vortex rides were relocated to new positions in the park to make way. It was named Rage after a competition in the newspaper Southend Echo to decide a name for the ride. The slogan is "For Superheroes only!" which is said before the first drop of the roller coaster.

In 2014 Adventure Island demolished the Pirate Boat, which was one of their oldest attractions, to make way for Adventure Inside in spring 2015.

In September 2016 the park retained a top five status in the "Friendliest Park In The World" category at the annual Amusement Today Golden Ticket Awards.

In September 2020, Adventure Island temporarily closed, following advice from Essex Police after a traveller encampment was set up in the nearby Kursaal car park. In an update on the company's Facebook page, Adventure Island told visitors that they had been "advised to close early due to traveller invasion!" and that it was "best to be safe than sorry!". The language used in the post was criticised by Traveller Rights organisations as reinforcing negative stereotypes about Traveller communities. The post was later deleted, and the company apologised for any offence caused.

In 2021, they hosted their first Pride event to celebrate the LGBTQ+ community, that hosted local drag queens performing. They also hosted their first annual Islandfest that celebrates local talented artists and musicians by showcasing their talents. Their yearly events include Fairy-tale weekend, Superhero weekend, a Halloween themed week, a Christmas Grotto, pride and Islandfest.

Rides and attractions

Rollercoasters
{| class="wikitable sortable"
|-
! Name
! class="unsortable" |Picture
! Type
! Year 
! class="unsortable" | Operational Status 
! Manufacturer
! Minimum Height
! class="unsortable" |Additional information
|-
Small Tivoli model. It looks quite tame although it has what has been called one of the best helix curves on a mini coaster. The train is half the length of that of the Green Scream and has a fibreglass pilot at the front, a dog at the back, with propellers mounted at each end.
|-
| Green Scream ||  || steel sit down || 1999 || Operating || Zierer || 1 Meter + || A family rollercoaster; height limit . No inversions and the drops are tame. The Green Screams train is green with a red interior, apart from the first car which is red and has a fibreglass crocodile to represent Snappy, a park mascot. The back of the rear car has the tail of the crocodile. The train is quite long, comprising 20 cars seating two people each.
|-
| Kiddi Koasta || || steel sit down  || 2011 || Operating || Zamperla || No minimum height || A children's rollercoaster; no minimum height. A speedy coaster which opened to the public on 30 April 2011. This rollercoaster is aimed at young children and people who are not used to larger and faster rollercoasters, due to its gentle drops, twist and turns.. It now operates on top of a building located in the park.
|-
| Mighty Mini Mega ||  || steel sit down || 2003 || Operating || Pinfari || 1 Meter + || Located on top of the Mega City arcade for added effect but was originally built on ground level with the arcade being built after and then the ride was placed on top; height limit . MM29 model. Has six cars each with two rows of two, seating 24 riders in total. The ride itself is short, however it is quite intense in some places with a helix towards the end and quite a sharp brake run.
|-
Eurofighter 320+ model.
|}

 1.2 Meter + Rides 

 1 Meter + Rides 

 No minimum height Rides 

Other attractionsAdventure Golf – two different courses available; extra charge.Sealife Adventure – not in Adventure Island but in an adjacent area.Funtopia Arcade – amusement arcades open when Adventure Inside is open.MegaCity Arcade - amusement arcades open when the park is open.

 Past rides 
A list of the past rides include:Devils Creek Gold Mine - was a Red Wristband children's track ride, which had a train of spinning barrel cars taken along by a train-like front carriage. The ride featured a rock tunnel and an outdoor section with much devil-theming scattered around the ride. The ride was originally known as the Jigsaw Train but over time received many theming updates until its eventual removal at the end of 2015 to be replaced by Adventureville in 2016. It is also referenced in Adventureville.American Freeway - a spinning ride similar to a Matterhorn ride but without the swinging cars. The ride type is almost the same as the Dragon that is now at the park, however this ride had large seats featuring high railings attached to the top of each seat for safety.Barracuda - an inverter ship style attraction with a white and brown colour scheme. It was located near the area of where Axis is now.Beezlee Bob's Trail - Currently Over The Hill 2: Spooksville - Was a Dark Ride built in 1999 and closed down in 2007 to make way for Over The Hill. The ride featured many whacky characters and had a spooky feel to itBlackbeards: All at Sea - was a cinema attraction located on the current site of the Adventure Inside section.
Blackbeards Pirate AdventureFantasy Dome - a large dome attraction.
Golden Hind
Mr Smee's Boat RidePirate Galleon - a typical pirate ship rideRaging River - Raging River was an Interlink IG flume ride that opened in 1996 and closed in 2006. The ride featured 2 drops and had a track length of 270 and was replaced by Rage the following year.
Sea SerpentSky Lab - a thrilling flat ride that is similar to an Enterprise ride but the cars where similar to that of a Matterhorn ride.Space Chase - a shuttle rollercoaster identical to Roller Coaster owned by Beeches Fun Fair on the UK travelling circuit. The ride had light blue track and white supports.Over The Hill - Over The Hill was the replacement ride for Beelzee Bob's Trail. Over The Hill was designed InHouse and many Audio-Visuals were produced by Sarner (http://sarner.com/portfolio/adventure-island-over-the-hill/). The ride shut down in 2017 and was rethemed into Over The Hill 2: SpooksvilleScorpion - a Tivoli Scorpion that opened in 2001; height limit 1.2 m and was a Blue Band ride. The ride closed near the end of 2018 to make way for Axis. Its site is now occupied by Dragon's Claw, which was moved from elsewhere in the park. The Scorpion ride has also featured at Gillwell 24 2019 after being removed, suggesting it is still in operation Vortex - An orbiter that opened in 2001; height limit 1.2 m and was a Blue Band ride. The ride closed in 2022 and was sold.Jungle Express – mini train ride; height limit 1 m. FalgasFormula 1A Karting – go karts, extra charge.Dodgems – bumper cars; extra charge, Closed In October 2022Magic Monsters''' – Small roundabout ride, opened in 1999 closed October 2022

GalleryMain gallery: Adventure Island at WikiCommons''

References

External links

 Adventure Island official website
 Interview with the park's owner, Philip Miller
 Adventure Island at ThemeParks-UK
 Adventure Island Review and Photos at T-Park

Amusement parks in England
Tourist attractions in Essex
Buildings and structures in Southend-on-Sea
1976 establishments in England
Amusement parks opened in 1976